Senator Bice may refer to:

Raymond Bice Sr. (1896–1994), Wisconsin State Senate
Stephanie Bice (born 1973), Oklahoma State Senate